Zinaida Krotova; (1923 - 2008) was a former Soviet female speed skater. She won a silver medal at the World Allround Speed Skating Championships for Women in 1950 in Moscow.

References

External links

1923 births
2008 deaths
Soviet female speed skaters
World Allround Speed Skating Championships medalists